(or ; ;) was an official term introduced in the Digest of Laws of the Russian Empire in the 17th century to define a social estate that included the lower court and governmental ranks, children of personal dvoryans, and discharged military. The category of  grew significantly during the massive trimming down of the category of service class people in the second half of the 17th century.  were of taxable estate, meaning those who had to pay poll tax. As a result,  of the 17th and 18th centuries significantly contributed to the urban growth in Siberia.

Later, in the common speech the term acquired a somewhat opposite meaning— became to denote persons of non-noble origin who due to their education were excluded from the taxable status and could apply for the status of personal distinguished citizenship.

Notes

References

Sources 

 

Society of the Russian Empire
Social class in Russia